Daniel Phillip Dugan (February 22, 1907 – June 25, 1968) was a pitcher in Major League Baseball. He played for the Chicago White Sox.

External links

1907 births
1968 deaths
Major League Baseball pitchers
Chicago White Sox players
Buffalo Bisons (minor league) players
Baseball players from New Jersey
Sportspeople from Plainfield, New Jersey
Sportspeople from Somerset County, New Jersey
Saint Louis Billikens baseball players